Hangzhou Museum, formerly "Hangzhou History Museum", is a national first-grade museum in Hangzhou, Zhejiang, China.

History
Hangzhou History Museum was established in 2001. It was reconstructed and reopened as Hangzhou Museum on June 9, 2012. Later Hangzhou Museum became a national second-grade museum.
On 18 May 2019, it was promoted to a national first-grade museum.

Exhibition
The museum primarily showcases the history of Hangzhou. Its permanent collection includes relics from many eras, including works considered to be national treasures. There is a hall dedicated to stamps, and another displaying works of calligraphers and painters from the region as well. The museum has incorporated many elements of modern technology. It also hosts temporary exhibits.

There are hundreds of models of food, including pastries made during the Song Dynasty, 800 years ago.

See also
National first-grade museums of China

References

External links

Museums established in 2001
Museums in Hangzhou
2001 establishments in China
National first-grade museums of China